Artūrs Kulda (born 25 July 1988) is a Latvian professional ice hockey player who is currently under contract with EC VSV of the ICE Hockey League (ICEHL). He is the older brother of Edgars Kulda.

Playing career
Kulda was a seventh-round 200th selection of the Atlanta Thrashers in 2006. He made his National Hockey League (NHL) debut with the Thrashers on 12 February 2010 against the Minnesota Wild. He was a member of the Chicago Wolves' Calder Cup championship team in 2008.

While playing for Latvia at the 2011 World Championships, in Bratislava, Slovakia, Kulda checked Radek Martínek of the Czech Republic into the boards, knocking him unconscious and requiring him to be hospitalized. Kulda was suspended three games for the hit because he made contact with Martínek's head and left his feet to deliver the hit.

On 15 July 2012, Kulda signed a one-year contract with Sibir Novosibirsk of the Kontinental Hockey League. At the end of 2012–13 season with Novosibirsk, Kulda signed a pro-rated one-year contract to return with the Winnipeg Jets of the NHL. Kulda did not dress for any game before returning abroad.

On 15 July 2013, Kulda signed a two-year contract with his second KHL club, Salavat Yulaev Ufa.

Career statistics

Regular season and playoffs

International

References

External links
 
 
 
 

1988 births
Atlanta Thrashers draft picks
Atlanta Thrashers players
Chicago Wolves players
Dinamo Riga players
Latvian ice hockey defencemen
Ice hockey players at the 2014 Winter Olympics
Ice hockey players at the 2022 Winter Olympics
Jokerit players
HC Kunlun Red Star players
Olympic ice hockey players of Latvia
Living people
Sportspeople from Leipzig
Nürnberg Ice Tigers players
Peterborough Petes (ice hockey) players
Ice hockey people from Riga
St. John's IceCaps players
Salavat Yulaev Ufa players
Severstal Cherepovets players
HC Sibir Novosibirsk players
HC Sparta Praha players
EC VSV players
Winnipeg Jets players
German people of Latvian descent
Latvian expatriate sportspeople in Russia
Expatriate ice hockey players in Russia
Latvian expatriate sportspeople in the Czech Republic
Latvian expatriate sportspeople in China
Expatriate ice hockey players in the Czech Republic
Expatriate ice hockey players in China
Latvian expatriate sportspeople in the United States
Expatriate ice hockey players in the United States
Latvian expatriate sportspeople in Canada
Expatriate ice hockey players in Canada
Latvian expatriate sportspeople in Finland
Expatriate ice hockey players in Finland
Latvian expatriate sportspeople in Germany
Expatriate ice hockey players in Germany
Latvian expatriate sportspeople in Austria
Expatriate ice hockey players in Austria
Latvian expatriate ice hockey people